Progress M-UM, was a specially modified Progress M 11F615A55, Russian production No.303, developed by Roscosmos to deliver the Prichal module to the Russian Orbital Segment (ROS) of the International Space Station (ISS). It was launched on 24 November 2021 at 13:06:35 UTC, along with a Progress M propulsion compartment and has the pressurised cargo module removed to accommodate Prichal. This was the 171st flight of a Progress spacecraft. It was the final flight of a Progress M and the first launch of a Progress spacecraft on a Soyuz 2.1b.

Development 
On 15 January 2011, RKK Energia announced that its Scientific and Technical Council (NTS) had reviewed and approved the preliminary design of the Node Module and associated hardware, including a special version of the Progress cargo ship designated the Progress M-UM spacecraft-module, intended for the delivery of the Node Module to the station. The space payload section for the Progress M-UM was dubbed KGCh. The Soyuz-2 launch vehicle was adapted for the launch of the Progress M-UM spacecraft-module, originally envisioned to take place in 2012, then 2019. It was eventually signed for as completed in 2014 and kept in storage until processing and attachment with Prichal was started for launch in 2021. It is attached to the Prichal module by means of a newly developed transition compartment.

The Prichal module was the second addition to the ROS in 2021. Earlier modules were delivered and added in a similar manner. Progress M-UM is similar in design to Progress DC-1 that delivered Pirs in 2001 and Progress M-MIM2 that delivered Poisk in 2009, but with navigational systems and avionics hardware taken from the Progress MS variant.

Launch 

A Soyuz-2.1b launched Progress M-UM to the International Space Station from Baikonur Site 31/6 on 24 November 2021, at 13:06:40 UTC for delivery of the Prichal module.

Docking 

Two days after launch, Progress M-UM automatically docked Prichal to the re-configured nadir (or Earth-facing) port of the Nauka module after removal of the module's nadir docking adapter by Progress MS-17. Progress M-UM, was later undocked and deorbited after 28 days and 15 hours in space.

Expansion of Russian Orbital Segment 

The ISS flight manifest drafted by Roscosmos at the end of summer 2020 set the launch of the Prichal module for 6 September 2021, with the docking to Naukas nadir port two days later. However, on 1 December 2020, the launch of Prichal slipped to three and four months after the Nauka. The planned launch date was on 24 November 2021.

One port on Prichal is equipped with an active hybrid docking port, which enables docking with the Nauka module. The remaining five ports are passive hybrids, enabling docking of Soyuz and Progress vehicles, as well as heavier modules and future spacecraft with modified docking systems. Eight spacewalks will follow in 2022 to complete the integration of the Nauka and Prichal modules into the Russian Orbital Segment.

Undocking 

The Progress M-UM propulsion section is remained docked at the station for 26 days. The propulsion section then undocked, revealing Prichals nadir docking port for future Russian spacecraft.

Atmospheric entry 

The propulsion section re-entered the atmosphere of Earth for destruction over the South Pacific Ocean, on 23 December 2021, at 04:30:54.

See also 
 Prichal (ISS module)
 Uncrewed spaceflights to the International Space Station
 Orbital Piloted Assembly and Experiment Complex - proposed complex (scrapped in September 2017)
 Universal Docking Module - former name Uzlovoy Module (eventually Prichal)

Notes

References 

 Russian Launch Manifest dated 23 July 2014

Progress (spacecraft) missions
2021 in Russia
Supply vehicles for the International Space Station
Spacecraft launched by Soyuz-2 rockets
Spacecraft launched in 2021
Spacecraft which reentered in 2021